T. K. Viswanathan (born 14 October 1948) is the  Secretary General  of the 15th Lok Sabha  and Lok Sabha Secretariat, Parliament of India, i.e. the House of the People in the Indian Parliament. As Secretary General, he is also the Administrative head of the Secretariat of the Lok Sabha. The post of Secretary General is of the rank of the Cabinet Secretary in the Government of India, who is the senior most civil servant to the Indian Government. The incumbent to the post is appointed by the Speaker of Lok Sabha in consultation with the Prime Minister of India and the Leader of the Opposition in the Lok Sabha. As per precedence, incumbents to the post of Secretary General have either been senior officers in the Lok Sabha Secretariat or senior civil servants in the Government of India.

In 2017, Government of India awarded him the fourth highest civilian award Padma Shri for his work in the field of literature & education.

References

External links 
 Official Biographical Sketch of Secretary General – Parliament of India

External links 
http://164.100.47.194/loksabha/Secretariat/SecretaryGen.aspx
http://164.100.47.132/lss_siteupdation/member/sg.pdf
 https://web.archive.org/web/20090831092354/http://164.100.47.132/LssNew/members/sittingmember.aspx
 
 http://headlinesindia.mapsofindia.com/parliament-news/lok-sabha/viswanathan-assumes-charge-of-lok-sabha-secretary-general-64549.html
 http://www.thehindu.com/news/national/article799383.ece

1948 births
Living people
15th Lok Sabha
Politicians from Chennai
Secretaries General of the Lok Sabha
Recipients of the Padma Shri in civil service